Harald Prokop is the Chief Technical Officer of SCVNGR, parent company of LevelUp, as of April 2012.

He worked at Akamai Technologies from 1999 to 2012, where he was Senior Vice President of Engineering and is also known for having elucidated the concept of the cache-oblivious algorithm.

References

Living people
Year of birth missing (living people)